USRC Wissahickon  was one of two Winnisimmet-class harbor tugs constructed by Spedden Company for the Revenue Cutter Service.  She was initially stationed at Philadelphia, Pennsylvania. Ellsworth P. Bertholf served as captain of her from 9 November 1906 to 20 September 1907 in his first tour as a commanding officer. Bertholf would later serve as the Commandant of the Coast Guard. After the U.S. Coast Guard was formed in 1915, she was known as USCGC Wissahickon. In 1916, she was transferred to Baltimore, Maryland.  The Navy assumed control of her from 6 April 1917 to 28 August 1919 during World War I. On 1 January 1923 she was transferred from Baltimore to New York City, where she remained in service until being decommissioned on 8 May 1935. On 8 May 1935 Wissahickon was decommissioned and later sold.

Citations

References used

  
  
 
  

1904 ships
Ships of the United States Revenue Cutter Service